Bamberg is an electoral constituency (German: Wahlkreis) represented in the Bundestag. It elects one member via first-past-the-post voting. Under the current constituency numbering system, it is designated as constituency 236. It is located in northern Bavaria, comprising the city of Bamberg, the southern part of the Landkreis Bamberg district, and the western part of the Forchheim district.

Bamberg was created for the inaugural 1949 federal election. Since 2002, it has been represented by Thomas Silberhorn of the Christian Social Union (CSU).

Geography
Bamberg is located in northern Bavaria. As of the 2021 federal election, it comprises the independent city of Bamberg, the municipalities of Altendorf, Buttenheim, Frensdorf, Hallstadt, Hirschaid, Pettstadt, Pommersfelden, Schlüsselfeld, Stegaurach, Strullendorf, and Walsdorf and the Verwaltungsgemeinschaften of Burgebrach, Ebrach, and Lisberg from the Landkreis Bamberg district, and the municipalities of Eggolsheim, Forchheim, Hallerndorf, Hausen, Heroldsbach, Igensdorf, Langensendelbach, and Neunkirchen am Brand and the Verwaltungsgemeinschaften of Dormitz, Effeltrich, Gosberg, and Kirchehrenbach from the Forchheim district.

History
Bamberg was created in 1949. In the 1949 election, it was Bavaria constituency 24 in the numbering system. In the 1953 through 1961 elections, it was number 219. In the 1965 through 1998 elections, it was number 222. In the 2002 and 2005 elections, it was number 237. Since the 2009 election, it has been number 236.

Originally, the constituency comprised the independent city of Bamberg and the districts of Landkreis Bamberg and Staffelstein. In the 1965 through 1972 elections, it also contained the Höchstadt an der Aisch district. In the 1976 through 1998 elections, it comprised the city of Bamberg, southern parts of the Landkreis Bamberg district, and the Forchheim district. It acquired its current borders in the 2002 election.

Members
Like most constituencies in rural Bavaria, it is an CSU safe seat, the party holding the seat continuously since its creation. It was first represented by Emil Kemmer from 1949 to 1965, followed by Paul Röhner from 1965 to 1983. Gerhard Scheu was then representative from 1983 to 2002. Thomas Silberhorn was elected in 2002 and re-elected in 2005, 2009, 2013, 2017, and 2021.

Election results

2021 election

2017 election

2013 election

2009 election

References

Federal electoral districts in Bavaria
1949 establishments in West Germany
Constituencies established in 1949
Bamberg
Bamberg (district)
Forchheim (district)